Mexico Unconquered: Chronicles of Power and Revolt is a book by John Gibler on national and regional politics in Mexico. The text discusses Mexico's historical continuity of conquest and the social movements that have formed as a result. Mexico Unconquered was published in 2009 by City Lights Books.

Further reading

References

2009 non-fiction books
American non-fiction books
City Lights Publishers books
Books about Mexico